Sadio Doumbia and Fabien Reboul were the defending champions but chose not to defend their title.

Luis David Martínez and Andrea Vavassori won the title after defeating Juan Ignacio Galarza and Tomás Lipovšek Puches 7–6(7–4), 3–6, [12–10] in the final.

Seeds

Draw

References

External links
 Main draw

Internazionali di Tennis Città di Verona - Doubles